The 2016–17 FC Red Bull Salzburg season was the 84th season in club history. They were defending League and Cup champions.

Squad

Out on loan

Left during the season

Transfers

In

Loans in

Out

Loans out

Competitions

Overview

Bundesliga

League table

Results summary

Results by round

Results

Austrian Cup

UEFA Champions League

Qualifying rounds

UEFA Europa League

Group stage

Statistics

Appearances and goals

|-
|colspan="14"|Players also registered for Liefering :

|-
|colspan="14"|Players away on loan :

|-
|colspan="14"|Players who left Red Bull Salzburg during the season:

|}

Goal scorers

Clean sheets

Disciplinary Record

References

FC Red Bull Salzburg seasons
Red Bull Salzburg
Red Bull Salzburg
Austrian football championship-winning seasons